The 1995 Denver Broncos season was the franchise's 26th season in the National Football League, and the 36th overall. The season would be a turning point for the franchise, as being the first year that Mike Shanahan would be head coach, and that would include the drafting of future 2,000 yard rusher and Super Bowl MVP Terrell Davis.

Off Season

NFL Draft

Staff

Roster

Regular season

Schedule

Standings

Season summary

Week 1 vs Bills

The Bills first game in Denver since 1977

References

External links 
 Denver Broncos – 1995 media guide
 Broncos on Pro Football Reference
 Broncos Schedule on jt-sw.com

Denver Broncos
Denver Broncos seasons
Bronco